Riaan Jeggels (born 10 September 1981) is a South African cricketer. He played in 40 first-class and 55 List A matches for Eastern Province between 2004 and 2011.

See also
 List of Eastern Province representative cricketers

References

External links
 

1981 births
Living people
South African cricketers
Eastern Province cricketers
Warriors cricketers
Cricketers from Port Elizabeth